The frontbench of His Majesty's Loyal Opposition in the Parliament of the United Kingdom consists of the Shadow Cabinet and other official shadow ministers of the political party currently serving as the Official Opposition. The Opposition front bench provide Parliamentary opposition to the British Government front bench, and is currently the Labour Party led by Keir Starmer since April 2020.

List of shadow ministers 
Key

Although listed, Parliamentary Private Secretaries do not sit on the front bench. Members of the front bench sitting on Labour's National Executive Committee are also listed.

Leader of the Opposition and Cabinet Office

Devolved and local government

Digital, culture, media and sport

Economy

Environment

Foreign relations

Law and order

Parliament

Social services

Transport

Women and equalities

Reshuffles and changes 
Keir Starmer appointed his first shadow cabinet on 5 and 6 April 2020, and completed the appointment of shadow portfolios on 9 April 2020, opposition whips on 14 April 2020, and Parliamentary Private Secretaries (PPSs) on 14 May 2020.

2020 
April

In the initial Shadow Transport team appointments, Mike Kane was Shadow Regional Transport Minister, Kerry McCarthy Shadow Green Transport and Aviation Minister, and Matt Rodda Shadow Buses Minister. Kane was subsequently appointed McCarthy's Aviation brief, alongside Maritime, and Rodda covered the Regional Transport brief.

Iain McNicol was originally appointed as an Opposition Whip in the Lords, but stood down on 15 April pending the results an investigation into his conduct following a leaked report.

Following a period of leave from the role, Tony Lloyd stood down as Shadow Northern Ireland Secretary on 28 April. He was succeeded by Louise Haigh, who was appointed to the position on an interim basis during his absence.

In late April, Party Chair Angela Rayner appointed Marsha de Cordova as Lead on Equality and Inclusion within the party, Tulip Siddiq as Parliamentary Lead on Party Development and Sam Tarry as Parliamentary Lead on Campaigns and Organisation.

May

Darren Jones stepped down as PPS to the Shadow Justice and Law Officer teams upon his election as Chair of the Business, Energy and Industrial Strategy Select Committee.

Rosie Duffield resigned as an opposition whip on 31 May after being found to have broken coronavirus lockdown rules.

June

Starmer sacked Shadow Education Secretary Rebecca Long Bailey on 25 June, and announced Shadow Child Poverty Strategy Minister Kate Green as her replacement two days later.

July

Shadow Women and Equalities Minister Gill Furniss moved to become an opposition whip on 10 July, and was succeeded by Shadow Faiths Minister Janet Daby, who became Shadow Minister for Faiths, Women and Equalities.

Lloyd Russell-Moyle credited a “right-wing media campaign” for his resignation as Shadow Environment Minister on 16 July, and was replaced by Ruth Jones on 12 August. Charlotte Nichols  succeeded Jones as PPS to the Shadow Northern Ireland Secretary, also remaining PPS to the Shadow International Trade Secretary.

September

After rebelling against the Labour whip on the Overseas Operations Bill, Olivia Blake, Nadia Whittome and Beth Winter resigned from their PPS posts on 24 September 2020.

October

Dan Carden resigned as Shadow Treasury Minister on 15 October, informing the leadership of his intention to vote against Labour whip on the Covert Human Intelligence Sources (Criminal Conduct) bill. Shadow Education Minister Margaret Greenwood and PPSs Mary Foy, Rachel Hopkins, Kim Johnson, Navendu Mishra and Sarah Owen also resigned later on the same date after rebelling against the Labour whip on the legislation. Owen had succeeded Beth Winter as PPS to the Shadow Chancellor of the Duchy of Lancaster earlier in the month. On 16 October, Wes Streeting was promoted to Shadow Education Minister, and James Murray and Abena Oppong-Asare became Shadow Treasury Ministers.

December

Janet Daby resigned as Shadow Faiths Minister on 7 December following her “misjudged” comments about registrars and same-sex partnerships.

Shadow Cultural Industries Minister Tracy Brabin announced she would be stepping down to focus on her candidacy for Mayor of West Yorkshire on 16 December. Shadow Sport Minister Alison McGovern was given the Cultural Industries brief, becoming Shadow Minister for Cultural Industries and Sport.

After voting against the Labour whip for the European Union future relationship bill on 30 December, Shadow Work & Pensions and Scotland PPS Tonia Antoniazzi, Opposition Whip Florence Eshalomi and Shadow Cabinet Office Minister Helen Hayes resigned from the front bench.

2021 
January

In a minor reshuffle on 7 January, Shadow Pensions Minister Jack Dromey and PPS Fleur Anderson became Shadow Cabinet Office Ministers. Matt Rodda succeeded Dromey in the Pensions brief and Sam Tarry filled the vacancy left by Rodda in the Shadow Transport team.

February

Karin Smyth announced her intention to step down as Shadow Northern Ireland Minister on 26 February to focus on constituency work and other issues, and was replaced by PPS Alex Davies-Jones. Emma Hardy resigned as Shadow FE and Universities Minister for similar reasons on 8 March, and was succeeded by Opposition Whip Matt Western.

April

Sarah Owen announced that she had rejoined the opposition front bench on 14 April, returning to her former role as PPS to Shadow Chancellor of the Duchy of Lancaster Rachel Reeves.

Resigning Shadow Defence Procurement Minister in April 2021, Khalid Mahmoud revealed his departure from the front bench in an opinion piece criticising the party after the May 2021 local election results.

May

Starmer conducted a post-local election reshuffle from 8 to 9 May, which began with the sacking of Angela Rayner as Party Chair and Campaign Coordinator. However, she successfully negotiated a larger role as Shadow Chancellor of the Duchy of Lancaster and Shadow Secretary of State for the Future of Work. Rosena Allin-Khan, Rachel Reeves and Cat Smith received promotions, alongside Alan Campbell, Shabana Mahmood, Lucy Powell and Wes Streeting who joined the Shadow Cabinet. Allin-Khan and Smith became Secretaries of State for their previous portfolios, and Streeting was given the new position of Shadow Child Poverty Secretary. Anneliese Dodds and Thangam Debbonaire changed roles, but Nick Brown and Valerie Vaz left the opposition front bench. Dodds and Mahmood also replaced Jim McMahon and Jo Stevens as front bench Labour NEC representatives.

Carolyn Harris resigned as PPS to Starmer on 11 May following allegations of spreading rumours about Angela Rayner, and was succeeded by Shadow Defence Minister Sharon Hodgson on 14 May.

Shadow Local Government Minister Kate Hollern quit on 13 May after facing allegations of interfering in a sexual harassment complaint. She was replaced by Opposition Whip Jeff Smith in a wider front bench reshuffle on 14 May, which also saw changes including Bambos Charalambous and Holly Lynch switching roles, Mike Amesbury's brief being split with Ruth Cadbury, and Paul Blomfield leaving the front bench. Rachel Hopkins rejoined the front bench as PPS to Shadow Defence Secretary John Healey.

A House of Lords front bench reshuffle also took place in May, in which The Lord Kennedy of Southwark took over from The Lord McAvoy as Opposition Chief Whip. The Baroness Blake of Leeds joined the Housing, Communities and Local Government team, The Lord Coaker joined the Defence and Home Department teams, The Lord Khan of Burnley joined the DEFRA team, and The Baroness Merron joined the Health and Social Care team. All four had been newly appointed to the Lords and nominated by Starmer.

June

The Baroness Chapman of Darlington joined the shadow cabinet upon her appointment as a Shadow Minister of State for the Cabinet Office on 22 June, serving as the opposite number to The Lord Frost.

Tonia Antoniazzi announced her appointment as PPS to Shadow Chancellor of the Exchequer Rachel Reeves on 23 June.

August

In the wake of a mass-shooting in his constituency, Shadow Environment Secretary Luke Pollard announced his intention to "step back" from his role for a month on 30 August. Shadow Environment Minister Daniel Zeichner covered Pollard's portfolio in his absence.

September

Marsha de Cordova resigned as Shadow Women and Equalities Secretary on 14 September to focus on her constituency, and was replaced by Anneliese Dodds on 21 September. Shadow Women and Equalities Minister Charlotte Nichols also stepped down at the same time for "personal reasons" and was succeeded by Taiwo Owatemi.

Andy McDonald resigned as Shadow Secretary of State for Employment Rights and Protections on 27 September, without a successor.

October

On 20 October, The Lord Collins of Highbury succeeded The Baroness Hayter of Kentish Town as Shadow Deputy Leader of the House of Lords. Hayter stepped down to become Chair of the House of Lords’ International Agreements Committee.

November

In a Shadow Cabinet reshuffle on 29 November 2021, Yvette Cooper returned to the front bench as Shadow Home Secretary. Pat McFadden joined the shadow cabinet as Shadow Chief Secretary to the Treasury as did Peter Kyle who became Shadow Secretary of State for Northern Ireland. Lord Falconer, Kate Green, Luke Pollard and Nia Griffith all left.

Most members of the Shadow Cabinet had their portfolios changed, with Lisa Nandy moving from Foreign Affairs to Shadow Secretary of State for Levelling Up, Housing and Communities (A combination of Housing and Communities and Local Government). Ed Miliband became the revived portfolio of Shadow Secretary of State for Climate Change and Net Zero, with the Business and Industrial Strategy part of his former portfolio going to Jonathan Reynolds. David Lammy took on Foreign Affairs and was replaced as Shadow Lord Chancellor by Steve Reed. Nick Thomas-Symonds became Shadow Secretary of State for International Trade, replacing Emily Thornberry who became Shadow Attorney General for England and Wales. Bridget Phillipson became Shadow Secretary of State for Education, Wes Streeting became Shadow Secretary of State for Health and Social Care, Jonathan Ashworth became Shadow Secretary of State for Work and Pensions, Lucy Powell became Shadow Secretary of State for Digital, Culture, Media and Sport and Jim McMahon became Shadow Secretary of State for Environment, Food and Rural Affairs, Louise Haigh was made Shadow Secretary of State for Transport and Jo Stevens was made Shadow Secretary of State for Wales.

The Shadow Secretary of States for Mental Health and International Development were demoted to shadow ministers, but still sitting in the shadow cabinet, at a rank similar to Shadow Chief Secretary to the Treasury. Preet Gill became Shadow Cabinet Minister for International Development under the Shadow Foreign Secretary and Rosena Allin-Khan became Shadow Cabinet Minister for Mental Health under the Shadow Health Secretary.

The position of Shadow Secretary of State for Housing was combined with Communities and Local Government to become the Shadow Secretary of State for Levelling Up, Housing and Communities, to shadow the government department of the same name. The positions of Shadow Secretary of State for Young People and Democracy, Shadow Secretary of State for Child Poverty and Shadow Secretary of State for Employment Rights and Protections were all abolished. The Shadow Secretary of State for Business, Energy and Industrial Strategy role was split into Shadow Secretary of State for Climate Change and Net Zero and Shadow Secretary of State for Business and Industrial Strategy.

Kerry McCarthy stepped down as Shadow Green Transport Minister for 'personal reasons'.

December

Appointments for Shadow Ministers, Spokespeople and PPSs were completed on 4 December.

Shadow Minister Rachael Maskell and PPS Mick Whitley resigned on 14 December, defying the party whip to oppose mandatory vaccination for NHS staff.

Kate Osborne was appointed PPS to the shadow Northern Ireland team on 21 December.

2022 
January

 Debbie Abrahams joined the shadow Treasury team.
 Shadow Immigration Minister Jack Dromey died on 7 January.
 Navendu Mishra was appointed as a whip on 8 January.
 Gill Furniss was appointed Shadow Roads Minister, leaving the Whips' Office. Her brief covers green transport, transport decarbonisation, future transport and roads.
February

Stephen Kinnock was appointed Shadow Immigration Minister on 3 February, and Luke Pollard returned to the front bench to replace him as Shadow Armed Forces Minister.

March

Barbara Keeley was appointed Shadow Arts and Civil Society Minister on 11 March, succeeding Rachel Maskell. Jeff Smith, another Shadow DCMS Minister, had covered the brief whilst the position was vacant.

May

Christian Wakeford was appointed Parliamentary Private Secretary to Bridget Phillipson, the shadow secretary of state for education.

June

Kerry McCarthy was appointed Shadow Climate Change Minister on 29 June, succeeding Olivia Blake who resigned citing personal reasons. Mike Amesbury resigns as Shadow Local Government Minister on 30 June.

July

Sam Tarry Sacked as Shadow Minister for Buses and Local Transport, for unauthorized media appearances related to the National Union of Rail, Maritime and Transport Workers strike.

September

Simon Lightwood was appointed Shadow Minister for Buses and Taxis at Labour Party conference.

2023

January 
Baroness Taylor of Stevenage was appointed as an opposition whip in the Lords.

See also 
 British Government frontbench
 Cabinet of the United Kingdom
 Frontbench Team of Ian Blackford
 Opposition frontbench of Jeremy Corbyn
 Leader of the Opposition (United Kingdom)
 List of British shadow cabinets
 Official Opposition Shadow Cabinet
 Parliamentary opposition
 Shadow Cabinet of Keir Starmer
Shadow Cabinet

Notes

Notes

References

External links
 His Majesty's Official Opposition
Spokespersons in the House of Lords

Official Opposition (United Kingdom)
Politics of the United Kingdom
Parliament of the United Kingdom
Keir Starmer